Joseph Lux (January 1757 – 9 May 1818) was a German actor and operatic bass), who appeared especially in comic roles.

Life 
Born in Glatz, Lux was first engaged from 1783/84 in Johann Heinrich Böhm's travelling troupe. In 1786 he changed to Gustav Friedrich Wilhelm Großmann, who at this time had joined the theatre entrepreneur Christian Wilhelm Klos and played in the cities of Cologne, Düsseldorf and Bonn. The music director of the company was Friedrich August Burgmüller. The important ensemble, which last performed in Aachen, gave rise to the Bonner Nationaltheater, which was subsidized by Elector Maximilian Franz with 15,000 Reichstalers per year and opened on 3 January 1789. Lux soon assumed a central position there. On 2 October 1789 he was also employed as a court musician. Temporarily, until February 1790, the Bonner Theater also included Heinrich Vohs.

Through his activities Lux came into close contact with the young Ludwig van Beethoven and accompanied him and the other members of the court chapel on the memorable journey the court made to Mergentheim in September and October 1791. Beethovens Jugendfreund Franz Gerhard Wegeler berichtet:

Beethoven probably composed for Lux the two comic arias for bass and orchestra Prüfung des Küssens WoO 89 and Mit Mädeln sich vertragen WoO 90, written in 1790.

On 7 July 1792 Lux made his debut in Frankfurt am Main, where he was heard by Goethe. He characterized him as a "crowded, well-educated middle figure" and an actor who "knows how to motivate his clothes and gestures after the roles". Soon Lux belonged also in Frankfurt to the most popular actors, as an article from Frankfurt reports:

Lux remained attached to the Frankfurter stage until his death. He died in Frankfurt at the age of 61.

Further reading 
 Alexander Wheelock Thayer, Ludwig van Beethovens Leben. Nach dem Original-Manuskript deutsch bearbeitet von Hermann Deiters,<ref>[https://www.worldcat.org/oclc/85202593 Ludwig van Beethovens Leben. Nach dem Original-Manuskript deutsch bearbeitet von Hermann Deiters] on WorldCat</ref> volume 1, 3rd edition, Leipzig 1917
 Ludwig Schiedermair, Der junge Beethoven, Leipzig 1925 (Numerised)
 Theodor von Frimmel, Beethoven-Handbuch, Leipzig 1926, volume 1, . (Numerised)
 Stephan Ley, Joseph Lux. Aus Beethovens Bonner Zeit, in Neue Zeitschrift für Musik, Jg. 121 (1960), 
 Albert Richard Mohr, Frankfurter Theater von der Wandertruppe zum Komödienhaus, Frankfurt 1967, .
 Klaus Martin Kopitz, Der Düsseldorfer Komponist Norbert Burgmüller. Ein Leben zwischen Beethoven – Spohr – Mendelssohn'', Kleve 1998, Cologne: Dohr,

References 

German male stage actors
German operatic basses
1757 births
1818 deaths
People from Silesia